The Football NSW 2020 season was the eighth season of football in New South Wales under the banner of the National Premier Leagues. The competition consists of four divisions across the state of New South Wales.

All NPL and grassroots competitions were suspended for one month due to the impacts from the COVID-19 pandemic in Australia, effective 18 March to 14 April, and further extended until at least the end of May. The regular season re-commenced in a condensed format from 18 July, with promotion and relegation suspended.

Competitions

2020 National Premier League NSW Men's 1

The competition resumed on 31 July with a single round-robin format (11 matches) followed by a two-week finals series. The NPL Premier normally qualifies for the national NPL finals series, but the 2020 National Premier Leagues finals series was cancelled in July.

League table

Finals

2020 National Premier League NSW Men's 2

The 2020 NPL NSW Men's 2 season was originally scheduled to be played over 22 rounds as a double round-robin. It resumed on 18 July as a single round-robin. Results from the first few rounds in March did not count.

Finals

2020 National Premier League NSW Men's 3

The season resumed on 18 July as a single round-robin. Results from the first few rounds in March did not count.

Finals

2020 National Premier League NSW Men's 4

The season resumed on 18 July as a single round-robin. Results from the first few rounds in March did not count.

Finals

2020 National Premier Leagues NSW Women's 1

The 2020 National Premier Leagues NSW Women's 1 was the seventh edition of the NPL NSW Women's competition to be incorporated under the National Premier Leagues banner. 12 teams competed, initially scheduled to play each other twice for a total of 22 rounds. The season resumed on 19 July as a single round-robin, but results from the first few games played in March did not count. The top four teams played off in a finals series.

League Table

Finals

2020 Waratah Cup
NSW soccer clubs commenced the 2020 FFA Cup preliminary rounds in March, only to see it suspended due to the impacts from the coronavirus pandemic. At the time of suspension, only the first round had been played. The competition was cancelled on 3 July.

References

2020 in Australian soccer
Football NSW season, 2020